Soniya Mehra is an Indian actress and daughter of actor Vinod Mehra. She is best known for playing Tanya Kapoor in Ragini MMS 2.

Personal life
Mehra is the daughter of actor Vinod Mehra from his third and last wife Kiran. She was less than two years old when her father died in October 1990. She was brought up in Kenya with her brother Rohan by her maternal grandparents.

Career 
Mehra made her acting debut in 2007 with the release of Victoria No. 203, a remake of the 1972 classic of the same name, and later had roles in the crime drama Shadow (2009), the romantic comedy Ek Main Aur Ek Tu (2012), and the horror thriller Ragini MMS 2 (2014). Mehra has also worked as a VJ on MTV India, participating in various shows such as MTV Grind, MTV News, and MTV Style Check. She has also worked as a Yoga instructor.

Filmography

References

External links 
 

Living people
Actresses from Mumbai
Actresses in Hindi television
Actresses in Hindi cinema
Indian television actresses
Indian film actresses
21st-century Indian actresses
Year of birth missing (living people)